Diksal is a village in Parner taluka in Ahmednagar district of state of Maharashtra, India.

Religion
The majority of the population in the village is Hindu.
  Temples in diksal 
There is a big temple of Vitthal and Rukmini . There is also small temple of Vanaspati devi temple in  parande mala of diksal

Economy
The majority of the population has farming as their primary occupation. Also, some of the villagers are primary teachers and some are members in defence service.

See also
 Parner taluka
 Villages in Parner taluka

References 

Villages in Parner taluka
Villages in Ahmednagar district